Julian Federick Hecker (1881-1938) was a Russian American Christian minister who settled in Soviet Russia in the 1920s.

He was born in St. Petersburg, Russia but moved to the United States. Here he attended Baldwin Wallace College, graduating in 1910. He went on to Drew Theological Seminary, Madison, New Jersey. He then stated his intention to return to Russia to serve the Methodist Episcopal Church. Hecker served as a student pastor in the USA and, speaking fluent Russian, he became assistant pastor of the Peoples' English Home Church in New York handling the needs of the 75 Russian members. He knew Warren Sturgis McCulloch when the latter was a teenager.

During the First World War, Hecker served as secretary to the U. S. War Prisoners' Aid of the American YMCA in Austro-Hungary. Prior to the U. S. entering the war, Hecker was transferred to Geneva, to work with the World's Alliance collecting and printing Russian books for distribution to POW's in German and Austro-Hungarian prison camps. In view of the difficulties in locating such books, Hecker also wrote some books for the prisoners.

By the early 1920s Hecker was living near Arbat, Moscow (Arbat) at 39 Starokonyoushenny with the support of Bishop John Louis Nuelsen.
Here he established a correspondence school and kept in contact with the leaders of the "Living Church" movement. As he became increasingly associated with this movement within the Russian Orthodox Church, Simmons became more critical of Hecker however Bishop Nuelsen remained supportive.

Works
 Russian sociology; a contribution to the history of sociological thought and theory, (1915) New York: Columbia University Press
 Religion under the Soviets, (1927) New York: Vanguard Press
 Moscow dialogues ; discussions on red philosophy, (1933) London: Chapman and Hall
 Religion and communism: a study of religion and atheism in Soviet Russia, (1933) London: Chapman and Hall
 The communist answer to the world's needs : discussions in economic, political and social philosophy; a sequel to Moscow dialogues, (1935) London: Chapman and Hall
 Religion and a changing civilisation, (1935) London: John Lane

References

1881 births
1938 deaths
American people of Russian descent